Suphisellus binotatus is a species of burrowing water beetle in the subfamily Noterinae. It was described by Fleutiaux & Sallé in 1890 and is found in Cuba, the Dominican Republic and Guadeloupe.

References

Suphisellus
Beetles described in 1890